Tazoult District is a district of Batna Province, Algeria. The capital is Tazoult, a small city of 5,000 inhabitants.

Geography
It is 1200 m above sea level, and surrounded by Jebel Doufana and Oustili Mountains to the west and Jebel Tafrent to the south.   Average temperature (°C) ranges from 5° in Winter to 26° in Summer though temperatures as high as 40° have been recorded.

Department
Since 1984, the commune of Tazoult consists of the following areas: 
 Boukha 
 Bouzène 
 Chaabet El Ghoul 
 Chenatif 
 Draa Ben Sebbah 
Steward 
Latrèche 
 Markouna 
 Merfeg Sidi Belkeir 
 Oued Bouhayoun 
 Oustilli 
 Tazoult 
 Tifiracine 
 Touafez 
The prison of Lambaesis was known for its harsh conditions and hosted Algerian nationalists the Algerian war of independence.

The current mayor is Cherif Guedouar who replaced long term mayor Moussa Fellah in 2012.

Toponymy
The name of Tazoult is a Berber word for khol in Tuareg or antimony in other Algerian or Moroccan variants.

Population
 1880 = 4732
 1966 = 64813
 1977 =9314
 1984 =11000
 1998 = 22114
 2008 = 27493

Municipalities
Tazoult
Ouyoun El Assafir

See also
 Lambaesis
 Algeria

References

Districts of Batna Province